Adriaen van Eemont (1626 – 10 September 1662) was a Dutch Golden Age painter.

Biography
Van Eemont was born and died in Dordrecht.  According to Houbraken he was "as good a bird painter as Melchior d'Hondecoeter. Houbraken had mentioned him twice earlier; as a specialist in painting water birds and plants, and as the teacher of the Dordrecht painter Johannes Offermans.

According to the RKD he is known for fruit still lifes and is possibly the same person as the landscape painter who signed with the monogram "AVE". He worked in Amsterdam, Heusden and France. In France he traveled with Frederik de Moucheron to Paris and Lyon.

There is still some uncertainty about the nature of his work; though Houbraken was so certain that he had specialized in birds and plants, the Dordrechts Museum has a work by him that is more reminiscent of Haarlem works such as those by Adriaen van Ostade.

Confusion with Nicolaes Ficke
His monogram "AVE" has also been interpreted as "NF" for Nicolaes Ficke, a 17th-century painter from Haarlem. The group of monogrammed paintings thus identified are considered to be paintings in the "Haarlem landscape style". An example of such a painting that was formerly attributed to Jan Wijnants is The Halt at the Cottage.

References

External links
Adriaen van Eemont on Artnet

1626 births
1662 deaths
Dutch Golden Age painters
Dutch male painters
Dutch still life painters
Dutch bird artists
Artists from Dordrecht